{{DISPLAYTITLE:C10H14O2}}
The molecular formula C10H14O2 may refer to:

 6-Amyl-α-pyrone
 4-tert-Butylcatechol
 tert-Butylhydroquinone
 Camphorquinone
 Dolichodial
 Nepetalactone
 8-Oxogeranial
 Perilla ketone
 Rhododendrol
 Spirodecanedione
 Wine lactone